is a Japanese music composer and arranger. Known as one of the biggest names in the soundtrack world, he has worked on a wide range of mixed media productions, including anime, TV shows, films and video games. Among his credits are Toei's Kamen Rider Heisei Generations Forever, Tsui Hark's Seven Swords and Young Detective Dee: Rise of the Sea Dragon; Wilson Yip's Ip Man; Mamoru Oshii's films The Red Spectacles, StrayDog: Kerberos Panzer Cops, Ghost in the Shell, Mobile Police Patlabor and Avalon; the anime adaptations of Rumiko Takahashi's Ranma ½ and Maison Ikkoku; the live-action adaptation of Gantz and Hideo Nakata's films Ring, Ring 2, Chaos, Dark Water and Kaidan.

His nephew, Hidehiro Kawai, is a bassist in Fox Capture Plan, an instrumental band.

Career 
After dropping out of a nuclear engineering program at Tokai University, Kawai began studying music at Shobi Music Academy. However, he dropped out after half a year. With a few friends, he created the band Muse, playing fusion rock and participating in music competitions. Through competing in such contests, the band members became technically competent to enter the music industry and decided to part ways.

After leaving Muse, Kawai began composing music for commercials in his home studio. While recording music for radio actor and voice actor Yūji Mitsuya, he met music director Naoko Asari, who advised him to compose anime soundtracks. Some of his work for anime soundtracks can be found in Ranma ½ and Ghost in the Shell. According to Kawai, he is not good at creating music from nothing, as he draws sounds from the visuals of the works. In the majority of cases, the images of the anime are not yet created, so he creates music when referencing storyboard visuals.

Following his success as an anime movies music composer, he became involved in live action movies. He contributed music to horror films: Ring, Ring 2, Dark Water, Japanese-Polish science-fiction film Avalon, the Hong Kong film Seven Swords and in the 2017 live action film Death Note.

Kawai has worked on several projects with director Mamoru Oshii (both Headgear members) and has written scores for all of the Hideo Nakata's films. The most recent film featuring his music is 2009's Assault Girls by director Oshii. Kawai's music has received the Annie Award and Hong Kong Film Award. In 2005, for Innocence: Kôkaku kidôtai (Ghost in The Shell 2: Innocence) he was nominated for an Annie Award.

For the music found in Seven Swords and A Battle of Wits he was nominated for Best Original Film Score Awards at both the 25th and 26th Hong Kong Film Awards in 2006 and 2007.

Works

Anime/television

Film

Video games

Documentary

Awards and honors 
 Asteroid 117582 Kenjikawai, discovered by Roy A. Tucker in 2005, was named in his honor. The official  was published by the Minor Planet Center on January 9, 2020.

See also 
 Anime
 Cinema of Japan
 Hideo Nakata
 Japanese horror
 Mamoru Oshii

References

External links 

  
 
 Kenji Kawai at Media Arts Database 
 

1957 births
20th-century conductors (music)
20th-century Japanese male musicians
21st-century conductors (music)
21st-century Japanese male musicians
Anime composers
Japanese conductors (music)
Japanese film score composers
Japanese guitarists
Japanese male film score composers
Living people
New-age composers
People from Shinagawa
Video game composers